Barleria aculeata is a species of plant in the family Acanthaceae. It is endemic to Yemen.  Its natural habitat is subtropical or tropical dry forests.

References

Endemic flora of Socotra
aculeata
Least concern plants
Taxonomy articles created by Polbot
Taxa named by Isaac Bayley Balfour